This is a list of electoral results for the Electoral district of Coolgardie in Western Australian state elections.

Members for Coolgardie

Election results

Elections in the 1920s

 Preferences were not distributed.

Elections in the 1910s

 The previous Labor candidate, Charles McDowall, had been elected unopposed in 1914.

Elections in the 1900s

Elections in the 1890s

References

Western Australian state electoral results by district